Kitchensource.com is an online retailer specializing in furnishings and accessories for the home, with emphasis on the kitchen, the bathroom, cabinet storage, and organization and the patio. Operating out of Stratford, Connecticut, the website launched in 1996 and the company now sells over 100,000 products from over 240 brand names to the United States and Canada.

History
A family-owned company, founded by husband and wife Donal and Bridget Gleeson, natives of Ireland, KitchenSource.com began business in 1996 out of their home in Trumbull, Connecticut. Donal Gleeson worked for over forty years in the kitchen industry designing and installing high-end kitchen and cabinet products in Ireland and the United States.

In 1996, the Gleesons established Kitchen Accessories Unlimited (KitchenSource.com.) For the remainder of that decade, the company focused on selling kitchen and cabinet accessories. After surviving the Dot-com bubble, and as business grew steadily, KitchenSource.com expanded its product offerings to include furnishings and accessories for the entire home, including the bathroom, bedroom, and patio.

Products and brands
Today KitchenSource.com is a "Top 500 Online Retail Company" and sells over 100,000 products from more than 240 international brands including: Rev-A-Shelf, John Boos, Hafele, Enclume, Catskill, Bush, Knape & Vogt, Broan, Home Styles, and Peter Meier.

Sales and customer service
KitchenSource.com fulfills orders through a comprehensive, secure website as well as directly over the phone. Part of the website’s sales model is to offer free shipping on many orders over $99.00, no sales tax, and a live customer service team.

Featured
KitchenSource.com was featured on two episodes of ABC's Extreme Makeover: Home Edition for donating ironing and fireplace accessories. The website has also appeared on HGTV.com for What We Love: Best Pantry Organizers and Countdown to More Space. CNN Money.com noted the website in Make Room: Space Saving Tips.

Other noteworthy mentions include:
 Natural Home Magazine, Sorting Options
 At Home Magazine, Decked Out
 Internet Retailer.com, It’s a Full Plate for KitchenSource.com
 Cotton Inc., Spin Cycle: Consumers Come Full Circle in Laundering With a Little Help From Manufacturers.

References

External links
 

Retail companies established in 1996
Internet properties established in 1996
Online retailers of the United States
Stratford, Connecticut